Founded in 1964, Kenai Peninsula College (KPC), is a unit of the University of Alaska Anchorage with four locations on Alaska's Kenai Peninsula and Anchorage.

History

Locations

Kenai River Campus (KRC)
Located in Soldotna, Alaska, the Kenai River Campus is Kenai Peninsula Colleges' original campus as well as the largest, boasting an enrollment of over 2000 students each semester.

Kachemak Bay Campus (KBC)

Located in Homer, Alaska, the Kachemak Bay Campus sits on 3 acres of land overlooking Kachemak Bay.

Resurrection Bay Extension Site (RBES)
Located in Seward, Alaska, The Resurrection Bay Extension Site allows Kenai Peninsula College to offer classes to students living on the eastern Peninsula, with classes housed in Seward High School.

Anchorage Extension Site (AES)
Located at UAA's University Center Complex in Anchorage, the Anchorage Extension site offers a chance for Anchorage students to earn degrees in KPC programs such as Process Technology and Instrumentation.

Academics

Bachelor degrees
Students can complete all of the following bachelor's degrees while at Kenai Peninsula College. These degrees are from the University of Alaska Anchorage.
 Bachelor of Liberal Studies
 Bachelor of Elementary Education
 Bachelor of Psychology

Associate of Arts degree
 Associate of Arts

Associate of Applied Science Degrees
 Computer Electronics
 Computer Information and Office Systems
 Computer Systems Technology
 Digital Art
 Early Childhood Development
 General Business
 Human Services
 Industrial Process Instrumentation
 Nursing (in association with the UAA Nursing program)
 Occupational Safety & Health
 Paramedical Technology
 Process Technology

Undergraduate Certificate programs
 Computer Information and Office Systems
 Mechanical Technology- temporarily suspended (as of 2013)
 Petroleum Technology
 Small Business Management
 Welding Technology

Non-transcripted certificates of completion

Computer information and office systems
 Office Technology
 Bookkeeping
 Web Foundations
 Desktop Publishing & Graphics

Other noteworthy programs
 Fire Science
 Certified Nursing Assistant

Special programs
 The Kenai Fishing Academy (KFA) is a week-long training session that teaches students how to improve their fishing skills.
 The Kenai Fishing Guide Academy is a week-long training session for prospective fishing guides on the Kenai River. The academy is overseen by the Division of Parks and Outdoor Recreation of the Alaska Department of Natural Resources, who help manage the river. Attendance is a requirement to be licensed to guide on the river.
 The Kachemak Bay Writers Conference is a 4-day conference that includes nationally acclaimed and award-winning authors  
 The Semester By The Bay is a program that brings students to the shores of Kachemak Bay in Homer, Alaska, to study for a semester

Student housing
Kenai Peninsula College offers student housing at its Kenai River Campus location in Soldotna.

The Kenai Peninsula College Residence hall officially opened in 2013, housing its first students the fall semester of that year. Located directly across from the Kenai River Campus, the Residence Hall houses 98 students. Housing is divided into 6 communities, each with 4 student apartments, 1 RA apartment and a common lounge area. Each student apartment features 4 private bedrooms, 2 shared bathrooms, a full kitchen and a common living space.

Activities for residents and other students are coordinated by KPC ResLife as well as the KRC Student Union.

References

External links
 

1964 establishments in Alaska
Buildings and structures in Kenai Peninsula Borough, Alaska
Community colleges in Alaska
Education in Anchorage, Alaska
Education in Kenai Peninsula Borough, Alaska
University of Alaska Anchorage
Educational institutions established in 1964